{{Infobox settlement
| name                     = Yobe
| official_name            =
| type                     =State
| image_skyline            = File:Tulutulu in yobe state Nigeria.jpg
| image_alt                =
| image_caption            = 
| image_flag               = Yobe_State_Flag.png
| flag_alt                 = Flag of Yobe State
| flag_size                = 120px
| image_seal               = Yobe State Government.png
| seal_alt                 = Seal of Yobe State
| nickname                 = Pride of the Sahel
| image_map                = Nigeria Yobe State map.png
| map_alt                  = 
| map_caption              = Location of Yobe State in Nigeria
| coordinates              = 
| coor_pinpoint            = 
| coordinates_footnotes    = 
| subdivision_type         = Country
| subdivision_name         = 
| established_title        = Date created
| established_date         = 27 August 1991
| seat_type                = Capital
| seat                     = Damaturu
| government_footnotes     = 
| governing_body           = Government of Yobe State
| leader_party             = APC
| leader_title             = Governor  (List)
| leader_name              = Mai Mala Buni
| leader_title1            = Deputy Governor
| leader_name1             = Idi Barde Gubana (APC)
| leader_title2            = Legislature
| leader_name2             = Yobe State House of Assembly
| leader_title3            = Senators
| leader_name3             = 
| leader_title4            = Representatives
| leader_name4             = List
| unit_pref                = Metric
| area_footnotes           = 
| area_total_km2           = 45,502
| area_rank                = 6th of 36
| area_note                = 
| elevation_footnotes      = 
| elevation_m              = 
| population_footnotes     = 
| population_total         = 2,321,339
| population_as_of         = 2006 census
| population_est           = 4,000,000 
| pop_est_as_of            = 2021
| population_rank          = 32nd of 36
| population_density_km2   = auto
| population_note          = 
| demographics_type1       = GDP (PPP)
| demographics1_footnotes  = 
| demographics1_title1     = Year
| demographics1_info1      = 2007
| demographics1_title2     = Total
| demographics1_info2      = $2.01 billion
| demographics1_title3     = Per capita
| demographics1_info3      = $843
| timezone1                = WAT
| utc_offset1              = +01
| postal_code_type         = postal code
| postal_code              = 620001
| area_code_type           = 
| area_code                = +234
| iso_code                 = NG-YO
| blank_name_sec1          = HDI (2018)
| blank_info_sec1          = 0.365 · 35th of 37
| website                  = 
| footnotes                =
}}Yobe is a state located in northeastern Nigeria. A mainly agricultural state, it was created on 27 August 1991. Yobe State''' was carved out of Borno State. The capital of Yobe State is Damaturu, and its largest and most populated city is Potiskum.

Geography
The state borders four states: Bauchi, Borno, Gombe, and Jigawa.Yobe State shares borders with Borno State to the east, Gombe State to the south, Bauchi and Jigawa States to the west and Niger Republic to the north.
It borders to the north the Diffa and Zinder Regions of Niger. Because the state lies mainly in the dry savanna belt, conditions are hot and dry for most of the year, except in the southern part of the state which has more annual rainfall.

History

Yobe State came into being on 27 August 1991. It was carved out of the old Borno State by the Babangida administration. Yobe State was created because the old Borno State was one of Nigeria's largest states in terms of land area and was therefore considered to be too large for easy administration and meaningful development. Ethnic rivalries within the old Borno State also contributed to the decision.

Climate
November being the sunniest month and rainy day is between August and December

Boko Haram
On 14 May 2013, President Goodluck Jonathan declared a state of emergency in Yobe State along with nearby Borno and Adamawa States, due to the jihadist terrorist network Boko Haram's insurgency. Boko Haram's leader Abubakar Shekau was born in Shekau village of Yobe.

Boko Haram's attacks in Yobe include those in Damaturu in November 2011, December 2011 and June 2012, Gadaka in December 2011, Potiskum in December 2012, November 2014 and July 2015, Mamudo in July 2013, Gujba in September 2013, Buni Yadi in February and May 2014 and Dapchi in 2018.

Local Government Areas

Yobe State consists of 17 local government areas (or LGAs). They are:

Bade
Bursari
Damaturu
Geidam
Gujba
Gulani
Fika
Fune
Jakusko
Karasuwa
Machina
Nangere
Nguru
Potiskum
Tarmuwa
Yunusari
Yusufari

Economy
While Yobe state is an agricultural state, it also has rich mineral deposits, including gypsum and kaolin in Fune local government and very rich agricultural resources as well. The State's agricultural produce include gum arabic, groundnuts, beans, and cotton. The State also has one of the largest cattle markets in West Africa, located in Potiskum.

Governor
On 29 May 2019, Mai Mala Buni assumed office as the governor of Yobe State under the Party APC ( All Progressive Congress) and Idi Barde Gubana is the Deputy-Gorvenor of the state

Ethnic groups

The major ethnic groups living in Yobe State are the Fulani and Kanuri, while other ethnic communities include Bolewa, Ngizim, Bade, Hausa, Ngamo, Shuwa, Bura, Marghi, karai-karai and Manga.

Languages
Languages of Yobe State listed by LGA:

Other languages of Yobe State are Duwai, Shuwa Arabs, and Zarma.

Education 
Tertiary institutions in Yobe state include:

 Federal College of Education (Technical), Potiskum
 The Federal Polytechnic Damaturu
 Federal University, Gashua
 Mai-Idris Alooma Polytechnic
 Shehu Sule College of Nursing and Midwifery, Damaturu
 Umar Suleiman College of Education
 Yobe State University

Religion 

The inhabitants of Yobe are mainly Muslims and Sharia law was established in the state in 2000 by governor Bukar Abba Ibrahim. However, there are Christians in the State although no Roman Catholic diocese has its seat in the state.

Politics
The state government is headed by a governor who is elected through a democratically process. The governor works closely with the State House of Assembly, which is the law making arm in the state.

Just like every other state in the Federal Republic of Nigeria, the electoral system of Yobe State is that of a modified two-round system. To be elected in the first round, a candidate must receive the plurality of the vote and over 25% of the vote in at least two -third of the State local government Areas. If no candidate passes this threshold, a second round will be held between the top candidate and the next candidate to have received a plurality of votes in the highest number of local government areas.

Natural resources 
Yobe State has deposits of trona and gypsum.

Notable people
 

 Uwani Musa Abba Aji - CFR (born 7 November 1956) is a Nigerian Jurist and Justice of the Supreme Court of Nigeria
 Usman Albishir - (15 June 1945 – 2 July 2012) former senator and Senate Minority Leader
 Mamman Bello Ali - (1958 – 26 January 2009) former senator Yobe Zone B and former governor of Yobe State.
 Idris Alkali - former chief of administration, army headquarters
 Usman Alkali Baba (born 1 March 1963) current Nigerian inspector-general of police
 Ibrahim Mohammed Bomai - (born 10 February 1960) a politician and the Senator representing Yobe South Senatorial District in the 9th National Assembly
 Imrana Alhaji Buba - (born 6 August 1992) activist, social entrepreneur, recipient of Queen's Young Leader Award
 Audu Bulama Bukarti - (1 January 1984) senior analyst in the Extremism Policy Unit of the Tony Blair Institute for Global Change
 Mai Mala Buni - (born 11 November 1967) politician and the current Governor of Yobe State
 Goni Modu Bura - former deputy governor, former senator, and current ambassador of Nigeria to Syria and Lebanon 
 Adamu Ciroma - (born 20 November 1934) former Minister and Governor of Central Bank of Nigeria 
 Ibrahim Gaidam - former governor and now Senator for Yobe Zone A
 Buba Galadima - politician and National Secretary of the Congress for Progressive Change(CPC) party 
 Bukar Ibrahim - (born October 1950) former governor of Yobe State and Senator in Nigeria
 Khadija Bukar Abba Ibrahim - (born 6 January 1967) member of the House of Representatives and Minister of State for Foreign Affairs
 Waziri Ibrahim - first republic minister and presidential candidate of GNPP in the second republic
 Alwali Kazir - former chief of army staff
 Ahmed Lawan - senator and Senate President of the 9th National Assembly
 Zakariya Maimalari - a brigadier-general, who was killed in the 1966 Nigerian coup d'état while commanding the 2nd Brigade, Apapa, Lagos
 Mahmoud Bukar Maina - (born 21 August 1986) a scientist, educator and science communicator
 Adamu Garba Talba - a politician and former senator Yobe south
 Ibrahim Talba - a former permanent secretary to the office of the president of the Federal Republic of Nigeria.
 Adamu Waziri - (born 14 September 1952) former minister of Police Affairs

References

External links
 Yobe State Government homepage
 UCLA Yobe Languages Project
 Erdal Can Alkoçlar
 Nigerian Post Office, with a map of LGAs of the state

 
States and territories established in 1991
States of Nigeria